William P. Turnesa (January 20, 1914 – June 16, 2001) was an American amateur golfer, best known for winning two U.S. Amateur titles and the British Amateur. He was one of seven famous golfing brothers; Phil (1896-1987), Frank (1898-1949), Joe (1901-1991), Mike (1907-2000), Doug (1909-1972), Jim (1912-1971), and Willie (1914-2001). Willie was the only brother not to turn professional. The family was referred to as a "golf dynasty" in a 2000 New York Times article.

Turnesa was born in Elmsford, New York and lived most of his life there. His older brothers forbade him to turn pro and pooled their money to send him to college. He graduated from Holy Cross in 1938 and won his first U.S. Amateur later that year at Oakmont Country Club.

Turnesa won the British Amateur in 1947 at Carnoustie Golf Links, beating fellow American Dick Chapman 3&2. He won his second U.S. Amateur in 1948 and was runner-up in the 1949 British Amateur, losing to Irishman Max McCready. He won numerous other amateur events, mostly in the New York area.

Turnesa played on three straight winning Walker Cup teams, 1947, 1949, and 1951. He was playing captain on the last team.

Turnesa served as president of both the Metropolitan Golf Association and New York State Golf Association. He co-founded the Westchester Caddie Scholarship Fund in 1956.

Turnesa died in Sleepy Hollow, New York.

Tournament wins
this list is incomplete
1933 Westchester Amateur
1936 Westchester Amateur
1937 Metropolitan Amateur, Westchester Amateur
1938 U.S. Amateur, Westchester Amateur, New York State Amateur
1943 Florida Open
1947 British Amateur
1948 U.S. Amateur

Major championships

Amateur wins (3)

Results timeline

Note: Turnesa never played in the British Open or PGA Championship.
NT = No tournament
DNP = Did not play
CUT = missed the half-way cut
R128, R64, R32, R16, QF, SF = Round in which player lost in match play
"T" indicates a tie for a place
Green background for wins. Yellow background for top-10

Source for The Masters:  www.masters.com

Source for U.S. Open and U.S. Amateur: USGA Championship Database

Source for 1948 British Amateur:  The Glasgow Herald, May 29, 1948, pg. 3.

Source for 1950 British Amateur:  The Glasgow Herald, May 25, 1950, pg. 9.

Source for 1951 British Amateur:  The Glasgow Herald, May 24, 1951, pg. 7.

U.S. national team appearances
Amateur
Walker Cup: 1947 (winners), 1949 (winners), 1951 (winners, playing captain)

References

External links
New York Times obituary
The Turnesa Story

American male golfers
Amateur golfers
Golfers from New York (state)
College of the Holy Cross alumni
People from Westchester County, New York
1914 births
2001 deaths